First Channel may refer to:

 First Channel (Georgian TV channel)
 Channel One (Russian TV Channel)
 First National (Ukrainian TV Channel)